Two-time defending champion Diede de Groot defeated Yui Kamiji in the final, 0–6, 6–2, 6–2 to win the women's singles wheelchair tennis title at the 2023 Australian Open. It was her fifth Australian Open singles title and her 17th major singles title overall.

Seeds

Draw

Finals

External links
 Drawsheet on ausopen.com

Wheelchair Men's Singles
2023 Women's Singles